The Manning, Bowman & Co. (1849-1945) was formed in Meriden, Connecticut, and over the years produced granite iron and pearl agate ware, electro-silver and nickel-plated ware, britannia and planished goods. 
 
The company location was at Pratt and Miller Streets in Meriden, occupying a unique triangular-shaped building that has since been demolished. Across the street across from the Meriden Public Library original, brick back buildings of the original Manning, Bowman & Co. can be seen.

As of 2016, over 70 Manning, Bowman & Co. designs are in American museums and collections, including most notably at Connecticut Historical Society in Hartford as well as the Brooklyn Museum, the Dallas Museum of Art, Museum of Fine Arts, Boston and Yale University Art Gallery.

Manning, Bowman & Co. exhibited products in the 1876 Centennial Exhibition in Philadelphia, the Exposition Universelle (1878) in Paris and the Melbourne International Exhibition (1880).

References

1849 establishments in Connecticut
Companies based in New Haven County, Connecticut
Meriden, Connecticut
Defunct manufacturing companies based in Connecticut